The Rocky Gorge Rugby Football Club is a USA Rugby club men's Division I rugby union team based in Columbia, Maryland, United States. Gorge plays in the Mid-Atlantic Conference in the Capital Geographical Union. Rocky Gorge is the 2012 and 2014 USA Club Rugby Division II National Champions and the two-time reigning Mid-Atlantic Division I Champion.

History

Foundation 
The origins of Rocky Gorge began in 1986. After playing in college, Tom Owens tried to play with Baltimore, but found it not worth the drive into the city. Owens discussed the idea of creating their own team with Dan Dawes and began to play with some local friends. Owens and Tom  Bleichner attended the Cherry Blossom Tournament in 1986 and started to recruit for a new team. The original squad was about 18 members strong and adopted the team name of "Rocky Gorge" because they played near the Rocky Gorge Reservoir Dam in Laurel, MD. Some of the original members of the club were Doug Illig, Carl and Ted Geppert, Larry Genovere, Matt Jerman, Steve Scepura, Ronnie Schwab, Brian Schwab, Tony Arminger, Greg Lockwood, Mark Owens, and Tom Gregoire.

Gorge's original jerseys were supposed to be black and silver. At the time, everyone wore long sleeve Maxmore jerseys and the only two places to get them were Matt Godek and Leatherballs (now defunct). Leatherballs had a team set of forest green jerseys that they sold the team cheap, so Gorge started off wearing solid forest green jerseys.

Rocky Gorge officially was founded in 1986. To gain legitimacy and enter an organized union, Gorge petitioned to become an associate member of the Potomac Rugby Union (PRU). The initial attempt was denied and the club was informed it would take two years to gain membership. Owens began scheduling matches with other clubs with the goal of improving its play. The team gradually began to get better, but the PRU blackballed the team for not following its guidelines and waiting for membership. Owens and Bleichner cleared up the issues with the PRU and were accepted into the union in less than the two-year waiting period as a Division II club.

Gorge's first coach was Terry Kernan, a Frostbrug graduate that knew how to run a club. Kernan eventually turned the reigns over to Chris Lee, another Frostburg alum, who had a positive impact on the club. That impact turned into wins and Gorge won the PRU in 1991. At Nationals, Gorge lost to the Fairfield Yankees.  After the 1993 season, a number of players retired. With players retiring or stepping away for various reasons, Gorge needed to grow to compete with the other clubs in the union and a merger with another local team was explored.

Merger of Rocky Gorge and Columbia RFC 
Discussions of the merger with another club began in 1994. Columbia RFC, founded in 1986 by Rob Innella, was a DIII club in the PRU. Following a Slug 7s tournament, Gorge leadership saw that the core of players was older and recruitment was slow. Both clubs saw that they were competing over the same resources in the same area. Rocky Gorge had a good rapport with Columbia and Owens and Columbia's Jim Hulbert talked about a merger at the Slug 7s. While talking outside the Triple 9s Bar and Billiards, the initial deal was struck between the two clubs. The merger took place to build a stronger team with a stronger foundation. The first combined Gorge-Columbia side played in Mason-Dixon's Halloween Tournament in the fall of 1994.

The points of the merger were that the new club would retain the name of "Rocky Gorge", although an alternate name of Savage Rugby was entertained. In addition, Columbia's outstanding debts to the PRU were resolved as result of the merger. The main members of the merger team were Rocky Gorge's Owens, Dave Eisenberg, Mark Matusek, Jeff Pace, Vincent Michalski and Bleichner and Columbia's Hulbert, Jim "Jabba" Morton, Mike Masood, and Tom Henry. Columbia's annual 7s tournament started in 1990, the Slug 7s, was adopted as part of the merger to go along with the annual Gorge Cup 15s college tournament. Slug meant "Salisbury Losers, UMBC Goons".

The first merger team was:

 Jim "Jabba" Morton
 Craig Albright
 Mark Butler
 Jeff Pace
 Steve "Tool" Moore
 Greg Florenzo
 Anthony "Conan" Cistone
 Kip Crecca
 Mark "False" Matusek
 Dave Eisenberg
 Kevin Nowaskey
 Mike "The Devil" Masood
 Tom "Chunky" Henry
 Jeff Brotman
 Scott Gardner
 Chuck Moore
 Eric "Jesus" Slonaker
 Bill Otovik
 Paul Retzbach
 Vince Michalski
 Bob Ott
 Tom Owens
 Jim Hulbert
 Rob "Roadblock" Seubert
 Bob Darrell
 Anthony Cinottti
 Pete "Shazam" Seymour
 Jeff "Pay Your Damn Dues" Rupp

The first president post merger was Tom "Plank" Bleichner and Mark Butler was the first player-coach of the team.

Post merger, the new squad played in DII and promptly won the PRU in 1995. For the next season, Gorge was placed in the DII-South Division of the Mid-Atlantic Rugby Football Union (MARFU) as part of the PRU.

Transition from Social Club to Competitive Club 
The period from 1996 to the late 2000s, Rocky Gorge was a team brimming with untapped potential, but ultimately couldn't put it all together. Aside from a two-year period from 2002-2004 where the team qualified for postseason play, Gorge suffered multiple losing seasons. For much of the 2000s, Gorge was known to be a social club with the motto of "win or lose, we still booze."

Chris Lee returned to coach the team from 1996 to 1998. In 1996, Gorge also held its first Gorge Cup 15s tournament. Meant to be a college 15s event that also showcased the Gorge 15s side in a league match, four games were played in the inaugural tournament. Frostburg played Salisbury, the Frostburg Old Boys squared off against the Salisbury Old Boys, and motley crew of Gorge players clashed with UMBC. The tournament is still played to this day.

Additionally, another significant tradition was adopted by the club in 1996. On the way to Savannah, Ga. to the St. Patrick's Day tournament, Vince Michalski played "Dancing Queen" by ABBA non-stop for four hours until the CD was broken, he then had another copy on continuous loop and played it until they arrived to their destination. From that moment on, "Dancing Queen" is the unlikely team song, dig it.

Former USA Eagle Clarence Culpepper took over coaching duties in 1999. Deploying a forward-oriented, smash-mouth, always recycling style of "machine rugby", Culpepper turned a losing record club into a playoff bound squad in 2003. Players from local colleges such as Frostburg, Salisbury, St. Mary's, and UMBC joined the team during that time and in the 2002-2003 season, Gorge had a 4-4 record advancing to the MARFU Quarterfinals against Raleigh, but lost 34-8.

Building on the success from the season before, Gorge took its first international tour to England. The team played New Milton in Bornmouth resulting in a loss, Avon in Bath which was another loss, and finally beat Cheltenham in Cheltenham to close out the trip. Once back in the States, Gorge had its best season since 1995 under new coach Bo Newsome. It placed third in the regular season with a 5-2-1 record and edged the Washington Irish in the MARFU Quarterfinals, 31-22. In the semifinals, Gorge got blown out by Norfolk, 42-5.

In 2004-2005, following a mass retirement by many players, Culpepper returned as head coach, but the results didn't show on the field. Culpepper stayed on for the next season, but play didn't improve. For all the negative on the pitch, Gorge knew how to have fun off the pitch.

In June 2005, Gorge threw its first themed picnic at Justin Tagg's farm. The 2005 edition was Pirates featuring a ship ready to sail. The picnics continued for the next four years that included 2006's Post Apocalyptic Road Warrior bash with Bartertown, 2007's Wrestling Extravaganza with entry music and a fully functioning squared circle, 2008's Cowboys and Indians Pow-Wow, and 2010's Rednecks and Hillbillies Drink-Up with a pig-wrassling competition.

Some of the many prominent players during the 1996-2005 era were:

 Chuck "Chitler" Moore 
 Matt "Nugget" Pickett 
 Damion "Big D" Dengler 
 Brendan "Hacksaw" Marr 
 Justin Tagg 
 Tom "Chunky" Henry 
 Jamie Welsh 
 Mark Miller 
 Chris Blieler 
 Greg "Five Sandwich" Florenzo 
 Bill "Chicken" Bush 
 Dave Eisenberg 
 Mark "Bear" Fredlund 
 John "Jo-Jo" Joseph 
 Ryan Frost 
 Hanibal Gnahoui 
 Billy Weeks 
 Mike "Karate" Brown 
 Jeremy "Pocket Lincoln" Hack 
 Vince "Monroe" Michalski 
 Marc "Fuzzy" Lycett 
 Eric "Jesus" Slonaker 
 Lee Wanless 
 Josh Bernstein 
 Ted Rollins 
 Pete Kelly 
 Andy Donovan 
 "Smokin" Joe Drummond 
 Roland "Wangzilla" Wang  
 Rob "Roadblock" Seubert 
 Rick "Windtalker" Kilbourne 
 Tony Connelly 
 Rick Day 
 John "Uncle John" Simmons 
 Chris "Biff" Timberlake 
 Peter "Dirty Pete" Dent 
 John "Fatboy" Bratt
 Jeff "Pay Your Damn Dues" Rupp
 Mike Henderson
 Paul Bayhurst
 Chris Powell
 Kevin Grunkmeyer
 "Jiffy" John Goodwyn

Find A Way 
Big changes started in 2006 when Chuck Moore became the sixth head coach of Rocky Gorge. Sensing that the team needed a new look to differentiate itself other local squads, the club colors were changed from green to royal blue, black, white. Gorge still struggled on the field in the 2006-2007 season, but the main positive was the recruitment of the first wave of Salisbury graduates.

Four recently graduated players from Salisbury, Matty Shover, Sean Kelley, Ashton Thomas, and Tyler Wickline, were welcomed to  Gorge. After having a perceived bad reputation in the PRU from college, many Salisbury graduates were not welcomed into men's club with open arms. The Salisbury Four found a home in Gorge because of a similar culture and a desire to have fun.

The 2007-2008 season was marked by highs and lows. Gorge went on its second international tour to Ireland playing Saint Mary's in Limerick, practicing in horrible conditions in Cork, and finishing up against Malahide in Dublin. The product during the regular season wasn't much better as club leadership had serious discussions of dropping down to DIII or even dissolving. Numbers were a major problem as the club barely had enough players for a starting side and struggled for the B side game.

In response, the recruitment machine began to build. Pete "3-Pete" Ressler, who had been on Gorge since 2003, brought in Kevin Nork who played at St. Mary's. The Salisbury train kept rolling with Erik Woodworth and former Rocky Gorge U-19 player Matt Burns. Gorge also tapped the UMBC pipeline to get Kevin Grooman and Ray Ahmed.

In 2009, Gorge took its third International tour to Argentina. During the ten day, 25-man tour, the club played Central Naval in Buenos Aires and Bigua in Mar de Plata. Following tour, Gorge had a team meeting with head coach Chuck Moore and president Trace Hall to concentrate on getting better as a club. Goals and plans were set in motion with a National Championship in mind. The players and coaches wanted to change culture of the club from a social side to a serious, competitive side to attract quality players.

The 2010-2011 featured a massive recruitment class, especially from the collegiate National Championship squad from Salisbury. The likes of Andrew Kendall, Derek Chell, Matt Carroll, Dustin Meehan, Rob Pashkevich, Michael Cheese, Kris Townsel, Josh Cherriman, Matt Crowder, CJ Dyson, and Jonathan Biermann came from Salisbury.

After noticing that the team didn't have warmup shirts and were getting ready for games in different colors, Justin Tagg bought blue shirts with "Find a Way" on them after a motto from Frostburg football. "Find a Way" became a mantra for the club and helped unify and focus the team with players from competing schools and clubs.

With new players added to the roster, Gorge went from last to undefeated 5-0 in conference play. In the MARFU Playoffs, it beat Wilmington (29-10) in the quarterfinals, outscored Jersey Shore (54-23) in semifinals, and lost to Doylestown (31-24) in finals.

Although Gorge lost in the MARFU Championship, it still qualified for the National Quarterfinals in Manassas, Va. Matching up against the Chicago Blaze, Gorge led at halftime up 6-5 off two penalty kicks. In the second half, Chicago kicked a PK to gain the 8-6 advantage. With about 10 minutes left, the Blaze tried to clear the ball deep in its zone with a box kick, but was charged down by Josh Cherriman. Pete Ressler scooped up the ball and scored, but the try was called back after a very late offsides call. Chicago took advantage of its opportunity scoring off a long run by its outside center to lead 15-6. With about two minutes remaining, Gorge moved the ball wide and Jon Biermann hit Ressler back on the inside for the converted try. Time unfortunately ran out on Gorge's hopes of advancing to the National Semifinals as it lost 15-13. It was a rough entry for Gorge's first time to Nationals, but it gave everyone confidence that Gorge could get to that level and hang with the best in the country.

After the match, the club gathered again to address concerns and what needed to improve upon to win a National Championship. Fitness needed to be improved off the field and a style/pattern/plan on the field needed to be implemented. Chuck Moore and the team president, Trace Hall, organized better funding to attract players (matching warmup shirts, team jackets). Ashton Thomas and Mark Cyphers were brought on as assistant coaches.

The prominent players of 2005-2011 were:

 Bill Bush
 Justin Tagg
 Ryan Frost
 Hanibal Gnahoui
 Billy Weeks
 Matty Shover
 Steve Ayigah
 Joe Madron
 Ashton Thomas
 Andrew Chesterfield
 Sean Kelley
 Matt Burns
 Dwayne Jenkins
 Pete Ressler
 Matty Wise
 Peter Dent
 Allstair Roper
 Ray Ahmed
 Kevin Grooman
 Marc Lycett
 Trace Hall
 Jessica "Dallas" Hayden
 Tony Connelly
 John Joseph
 Kevin Nork
 Will Tipton
 Tyler Wickline
 Erik Woodworth
 Chris Blieler
 Patrick Carr
 Evan Lappen
 Kris Townsel
 Kevin Grunkmeyer
 Kevin Kehoe

2012 National Championship 
With recruitment of more newly graduated collegiate players in the summer of 2011, many of the new recruits still weren't sold on Gorge as a contender. Ashton Thomas organized a Salisbury only meeting and laid down an ultimatum, "You guys are with us or against us," Ashton Thomas said. "We're not going to wait around any more. We are going to move on with or without you. You have adopt the Rocky Gorge way, this is the way we are going to do it, and we are moving forward this way. Josh Brown always looked at that as the turning point of Rocky Gorge as a whole. After that we took off, the people who bought in stayed, whoever didn't left. We took off and the rest of the season did the way it did in 2012."

The player haul of 2012 included Josh Brown, Bryan Perez, Will Miller, Josh Stallings, and Mark Cyphers, Gorge rode an undefeated 5-0 record in Division II-South of the MARFU to the conference playoffs. In the quarterfinals, Gorge beat Brandywine, 58-24, and then bested Severn River, 39-22, in the semifinals. In the conference championship, Gorge finished off Wilmington, 29-24, to move on to Nationals.

On Sunday, Gorge played a tough Montauk Sharks club in the quarterfinals. Trailing 17-5 at the half, Gorge scored 22 unanswered points in the second half to win 27-17.

After raising over $25,000 to send the team to Infinity Park in Glendale, Colorado for the championship weekend, Gorge faced Pacific Champion, Santa Rosa Rugby Club, on Saturday in the National Semifinals. In a match that lasted almost four hours because of weather delays, Gorge emerged as the 25-17 victor. Here are the links to the first half  and the second half .

On Sunday in the stadium at Infinity Park, Gorge met the Wisconsin Rugby Club to decide the DII National Championship. After trailing for most of the first half, Rocky George fought back and closed the gap to 17-12 at halftime behind a pick and go try from Bryan Perez and an Andrew Kendall score set up by the strong running of Jon Biermann.

With the momentum coming out of the half, Dustin Meehan grabbed the lead for Gorge with a try in the 44th minute and a subsequent conversion by Kendall. Wisconsin answered with a penalty to retake the lead at 20-19, but Gorge came right back with another forwards try by Will "A Strong Specimen of a Man" Miller in the 50th minute.

Another Wisconsin penalty narrowed the score to 24-23, however, Gorge continued to pound with their forwards and backs. A Josh Brown try in the 65th minute extended the lead to 31-23. Kendall tacked on two more penalties in the final 15 minutes to close out the match and bring the trophy home to Maryland. Gorge triumphed 37-26 to win its first National title and Kendall was named MVP for his efforts. The link to the match is here .

The members of the 2012 National Championship team are:

 Bryan "LA" Perez
 Matt "Toad" Carroll
 Erik "Easy" Woodworth
 CJ "Tank" Dyson
 Kevin Nork
 Dustin "Party Boy" Meehan
 Matt Burns (Captain)
 Sean Kelley
 Matt "Cooder" Crowder
 Josh Stallings
 Jay Benedetti
 Andrew "Copperpot" Chesterfield
 Derek Chell
 Jonathan Biermann
 Andrew "Air Force" Kendall
 Josh "Drago" Cherriman
 Bill Bush
 Eoghan "Biff" Doherty
 Will Miller
 Matty Shover
 Paul Clarke
 Josh Brown
 Rico Colon
 Chuck Moore (head coach)
 Mark Cyphers (assistant coach)
 Ashton Thomas (assistant coach)

2014 National Championship 
After a disappointing end to the 2012-2013 season in the National Quarterfinals, Gorge refocused its efforts for another championship run in 2014. With the core of its 2012 squad intact, key additions in place, and under the leadership of new coach and former U.S. Eagle Will Brewington, Gorge raced to an 8-0 record in Mid-Atlantic DII South piling up 413 points and only 71 points against. In addition to its DII club, the 2013-2014 was the first season of its DIII side where Gorge went 6-8 in its inaugural season.

In the conference playoffs, Gorge destroyed the Lancaster Roses, 76-7, and followed it up with a 46-29 second half thrashing of Doylestown Rugby Club in the semifinals. On Sunday in the conference final, Gorge clawed back from a 14-point deficit at halftime to exact revenge on its rival Wilmington to win, 34-24. Wilmington held a 24-10 lead at the intermission after capitalizing a Gorge's mistakes. Gorge refocused at halftime paying attention to ball retention and finishing what it started. Behind tries from Nick Sylor, Nick DiMichele, Matt Carroll, and a clutch intercept by Ben Snyder, Gorge scored 24 unanswered points to achieve victory and move onto Nationals.

Advancing to Nationals for the fourth straight year, Gorge's quarterfinal matchup was a rematch of the 2012 championship against Wisconsin. In a defensive battle under horrible field and weather conditions, Gorge and Wisconsin traded blows in a closely contested affair. Nick DiMichele and Dustin Meehan scored for Gorge and Pete Ressler chipped in both conversions for a 14-point lead. Four minutes away from the shutout, Wisconsin made able to score a try off a charged down kick to cut the lead to 14-7. The Gorge defense clamped down and finished the game with a victory. The link to the match is here .

In the National Semifinal against New Haven Old Black RFC on Sunday, Gorge barely survived in an intense match full of momentum swings and tense moments. Gorge played great rugby for 60 minutes of the match building a 34-14 lead. The Old Black stormed back in the final 20 minutes as their backs burned up the defense. New Haven cut the advantage to one point at 34-33 with no time remaining and only the final conversion to be attempted. Fortunately for Gorge, the kick from the sideline sailed wide booking its ticket to the National Championship in Madison, Wisconsin. The link to the match is here .

Returning the main event for the second time in three years, Gorge faced a formidable foe in the West's Tempe Old Devils. The Arizona club was an undefeated outfit from the Pacific South known for its potent and lethal offense. The DII National Championship at Breese Stevens Field in Madison, Wisconsin featured a clash in styles that culminated in an exciting 80 minutes of rugby.

As the game progressed, Rocky Gorge's stout defense and fundamental, ball-control offense stifled its opponent's attack as Tempe struggled to deploy its offense. Gorge shut out Tempe in the first half as Pete Ressler converted on a penalty, Josh Brown scored off a designed lineout play, and Jay Benedetti took an intercept try 40 meters for the 15-0 lead at the half.

Tempe looked to have righted the ship scoring in the 45th minute to cut the advantage to ten points, but Gorge's gritty and consistent defense continued to keep the Old Devils at bay. Two tries by scrumhalf Nick Sylor extended the lead to 27-5 and the defense closed out the match. Captain and eightman Josh Brown earned the MVP for his leadership and strong running from the back of the scrum. The link to the match is here .

The members of the 2014 National Championship team are:

 Bryan Perez
 Matt Carroll
 Tony Ayigah
 Will Miller
 James Rehak
 Dustin Meehan
 Nick DiMichele
 Josh Brown (Captain)
 Nick Sylor
 Pete Ressler
 Jay Benedetti
 Josh Cherriman
 Derek Chell
 Jonathan Biermann
 Josh Stallings
 Sam Ausden
 LJ Pignenburg
 Rico Colon
 CJ Dyson
 Kevin Jackson Jr.
 Eoghan Doherty
 Ben Snyder
 Will Brewington (head coach)
 Mark Cyphers (assistant coach)
 Sid Miller (assistant coach)

One last DII season 
After winning the DII Mid-Atlantic, Gorge was offered a promotion to Division I for the 2014-2015 season. The club leadership declined and focused on its upcoming DII schedule. Gorge once again ripped through its opponents mounting an 8-0 regular season record. In addition to its divisional adversaries, Gorge also beat DI's Raleigh and the Potomac Exiles and tied the ARP's Boston RFC. The higher quality competition prepared Gorge for the conference playoffs as it ran past Media, Philadelphia-Whitemarsh, and Wilmington on its way to its third Mid-Atlantic Championship in four years. The DIII side improved from its first year finishing the season at 4-4.

In the National Quarterfinals in Charlotte, NC, Gorge was matched up against the South Champion, the Atlanta Old White. AOW jumped out to a 14-0 lead, but Gorge answered back with two Josh Brown tries to tie it up. Unfortunately for Gorge, scrumhalf Nick Sylor was injured shortly after and Coach Brewington had to go to his bench early. The Old White surged ahead once more to lead 21-14 at the half.

Gorge tightened up its game plan and dominated the first 20 minutes of the second half. With tries from Josh Cherriman, Matt Carroll, and Will Miller, Gorge regained the lead at 29-21. Atlanta rallied in the final 15 minutes to score the final two tries of the match and Gorge lost, 35-29.

Promotion to DI 
At the end of the season, Gorge was promoted to Division I. Nick DiMichele took over the head coaching duties and significant additions such as US Eagle Ben Cima, Matias Cima, Brady Smith, Trevor Tanifum, Mike Tillman, Scotty Wheeler, and John Capobianco were welcomed to the club. Before the 2015-2016 regular season began, Gorge tested its might fulfilling its home and away match against Boston. In the early season primer, Gorge beat the Massachusetts squad, 22-17, on the road. Ready for its first DI romp and sporting new black and blue jerseys, Gorge enjoyed immediate success in DI shutting out three of its first four opponents. The wins continued to rack up and completed an undefeated 14-0 record, which included a 36-33 victory over the visiting ARP side, New York Athletic Club RFC.

In the DI Mid-Atlantic Playoffs, Gorge smacked Baltimore-Chesapeake in the semifinals, 66-7, to advance to the final against the Norfolk Blues. Using its superior speed and skill of its backline, Gorge outplayed the Blues en route to a 48-22 victory in its first year in DI. Trevor Tanifum, Scotty Wheeler, Nick Sylor, Brady Smith, Nick Kuhl, and Matias Cima (2) each scored in the match. Flyhalf Ben Cima led all scorers with 13 points with five conversions and a drop goal. With the win, Gorge advanced to the National Quarterfinals against Old Blue of New York.

For the DIII side, 2015-2016 was a breakout season. RGIII finished the regular season with an 8-1-1 record. In conference playoffs, Gorge dispatched Virginia Beach and the Washington Renegades to the way to the finals. Against Reading in the DIII MAC Championship, William Lomax, Aki Raymond (2), Matthew Phillips, and Bill Bush scored tries and Chris Bleiler had two conversions and a penalty for the 32-24 win. After the match, the determination of which team advanced to Nationals was disputed due to an eligibility issue. In the end, the USA Rugby Grievance Committee ruled in favor of Rocky Gorge allowing it to represent the Mid-Atlantic at Nationals.

The DIII Mid-Atlantic Champions were:

 Jackson Drury
 Zack Herd
 Scott Hutchison
 Korey Rankin
 Wilson Campbell Jr.
 Quentin Koonce
 Philip Perrault
 William Lomax
 Neil Watson
 Chris Blieler
 Aki Raymond
 Cordell Drummond
 Nadir Mechairia
 Pat Peroutka
 Matthew Philips
 Matt Dwyer
 Tyler Savoye
 Nick Capobianco
 Bill Bush
 Zaven Mzatzakanian
 Tyler Tippett
 Michael Peuse
 Arya Koolaee
 John Long
 Jamel Murray
 Chris Blieler (head coach)
 Will Brewington (assistant coach)
 Jake Klaus (assistant coach)

At Founders Field in Pittsburgh, the DIII side played and was clearly outmatched by the eventual DIII National Champion, the Fairfield Yankees. The opposition dominated from the opening whistle and ended the DIII season by the score of 39-12.

Playing on the beaten muddy field later in the day, Gorge DI played Old Blue with a ticket to the National Semifinals at stake. In a tough, hard fought test, Gorge matched Old Blue stride for stride and only trailed by three points with seven minutes remaining. Gorge was unable to complete the comeback in the final moments of the game as Old Blue won, 27-19. In the losing effort, Will Miller scored his team's lone try and Ben Cima kicked four penalties and a conversion.

2016–2017 season 
In 2016-2017, Rocky Gorge repeated as the DI Mid-Atlantic Champions for the second year in a row towering over Norfolk, 52-31. In the National Quarterfinals in Pittsburgh, Pa., Gorge's season came to an end at the hands of the Chicago Lions, the Midwest Champion, 32-24.

After winning DIII last season, Gorge's second side was promoted to DII. In its first year of elevated competition, RGII finished fourth in the DII-South with a 4-6 record.

2017–2018 season 
Coming off its second Mid-Atlantic Conference DI title, Gorge went into the 2017-2018 season in search of its third conference championship. Unfortunately, Gorge was stopped short by rival, the Norfolk Blues. Gorge beat Norfolk in week seven and went into the regular season finale against the Blues undefeated. On the road, Gorge led at the half but Norfolk scored four tries in the second half to win 39-35. Gorge easily beat Pittsburgh in the MAC Semifinals setting up a rematch with Norfolk in the final. In the rain, Gorge led late 21-15, but the Blues scored twice in the final ten minutes to win 29-21.

Gorge's second side played in Division I-B against other DI clubs' B-sides and other DII clubs. The team went 7-2 in the regular season, but fell to Philadelphia-Whitemarsh, 57-14, in the MAC quarterfinals.

2018–2019 season 
Following the disappointing 2017-2018 season, Rocky Gorge made a change at the top installing Andrew "Copperpot" Chesterfield as club president and named a board to the team. Additionally, during the club banquet in November, Chuck Moore and Tom Henry donned the blue jackets as new members of the Rocky Gorge Hall of Fame.

Gorge was placed in the DI North division along with Schuylkill River, Pittsburgh, and Baltimore-Chesapeake. They will play each divisional opponent twice and play each team from the South division once.

Refocused with a return to Nationals at the forefront of its mind, Gorge DI swept through the Mid-Atlantic competition to an undefeated 10-0 record. In the conference playoffs, the team dispatched Potomac and NOVA to book its trip back to Nationals. Awaiting them in Raleigh were the Life Running Eagles. In a hard fought test, Life outmatched Gorge on the way to a 69-26 defeat.

Gorge's second side dropped down to DIII and flourished. During the regular season, the squad won every game they played in. That being said, RGD3 had to unfortunately forfeit two of their games. Even with the forfeits, the team made it to the Central division final versus the Washington Irish. It took 100 minutes of rugby to complete but RGD3 triumphed for the 38-35 victory. Two weeks later in the Capital Championship, Gorge beat the Virginia Beach Falcons, 25-12, to earn its spot in the MAC Final. Against the Northeast Philadelphia Irish in the mud and rain, the opposing enforced its will by bigger, more physical outfit punishing Gorge with their forwards then using the kicking game to pin Gorge deep. The Irish swarmed Gorge's back three and Gorge was unable to use its speed on the counterattack. The RGD3 2018-2019 season ended by a score of 41-7.

2019–2020 season 
After dropping its first game on the road against Schuylkill River, DI finished the fall with six straight victories to lead the north division. D3 followed up its Capital Championship with four consecutive wins to open the fall. RGD3 fell against division leaders, the Washington Irish and Severn River, to complete 2019 in third place at 5-2.

As the year flipped to 2020, the spring and entire season ended abruptly. USA Rugby shut down club rugby due to the COVID-19 virus and all games and team activities were cancelled. Gorge will rise again hopefully in the fall.

2021-2022 season
Following the sudden end of the 2019-2020 Season rugby began in the spring of 2021. Spring held only friendly matches between clubs in order to rebuild and return to play. Gorge began to rally in the fall of 2021, bringing both new and old faces to hopefully reach the playoffs once more. 

Post Covid Players were:

Jose Barahona
Mickey Bressler
Cam Hoppman
Tony Ayigah
Matt "Toad" Carroll
James Park
Nick Hryekewicz
Will Miller
Mason Mcilwee
Derrell "DK" Kittrell
Jake Saintcross
Josh Brown
Deonta Matila
Joel Henry
Tristan Cole
Sean Hartig
Nick Kuhl
Jake Soriano
Luc "Lucky" Desroches
Joe McElhenny
Chris Minor
Eugene Becton
Hunter Shelton
Kevin Koch
Joe Zarelli
David "Red" Coleman

Hall of Fame

Tom "Odie" Owens 
As the founding father of Rocky Gorge, Tom "Odie" was inducted into the RG Hall of Fame in 2014. Owens began his rugby career playing as a prop for four semesters at Frostburg before he was expelled from school. After not finding a club to his liking, Owens and a group of friends founded Rocky Gorge in 1986 and became the club's first President. After playing scrumhalf for ten years, Owen's final season of senior men's club was 1996, but continued to play with the Gorge Old Boys until 2004.

Starting Rocky Gorge was Owens' biggest accomplishment. "I see how many people it has affected their lives. People have gotten jobs through the club, careers, marriages, divorces. People have made life long friends. To meet and have connections through the culture of rugby. When I see that the current guys are so successful, I can't believe that I was part of all of it."

Jim Hulbert 
Jimmy Hulbert was inducted into the Hall of Fame in 2015. Hulbert started playing in college at Salisbury from 1985 to 1989 as a hooker and loose forward. Jim joined Columbia RFC in 1990 after college playing the same positions. As the president of Columbia RFC during the merge, Hulbert was pivotal in the discussions and worked with Owens and other to finalize the merger.

Jim's major accomplishment was taking over coaching and administering the Howard County Hurricanes Youth Organization in 2001, and has continued those duties with the Hurricanes for 16 years. Hulbert was integral in establishing and promoting youth rugby in Howard County. Rocky Gorge has provided coaching and support to the Hurricanes and players such as Matt Burns, Cordell Drummond, and Brandon Drummond have come back to Gorge to play for the men's club. In addition, two other players have gone on to play in the College Rugby Championships.

Clarence Culpepper 
As a legendary coach of Rocky Gorge from 2000 to 2007, Clarence Culpepper was inducted into the Hall of Fame in 2015. Before becoming Gorge's head coach, Culpepper played linebacker for Virginia Tech and suited up for the Roanoke RFC before being capped twice as a USA Eagle in 1977 and 1978. Culpepper's coaching career began in 1980 spanning multiple clubs in the Mid-Atlantic. Clarence was such highly regarded as a coach that he was tapped to call the shots for the USA National Team in 1990 and 1992. In addition to RG's Hall of Fame, Culpepper has also been inducted into the Virginia Rugby Hall of Fame  and the Philadelphia-Whitemarsh Hall of Fame.

Beginning in 2000 as head coach, Culpepper was an intense coach and responsible for turning Gorge into a rugby powerhouse with his brand of "Machine Rugby". Clarence's taught a forwards-oriented philosophy to keep recycling the ball and hitting.

Dave Eisenberg 
Dave Eisenberg was inducted into the Hall of Fame in 2016. Eisenberg began playing at Frostburg from 1985-1987 and joined Gorge in spring 1989. Playing fullback, flyhalf, and as a utility player, Dave kicked points for Gorge from 1989 to 1995 and earned team MVP honors in 1991. He continued to play for Gorge until 2003 and started the GODS (Gorge Old Dudes) Old Boys team in 1999. In addition to being the match secretary at the time of the club merger, Eisenberg was the team president from 1993-1995.

Known to be a great player and club man, Dave has been immortalized by Rocky Gorge in song, "Dave Eisenberg, Dave Eisenberg, how we love you Dave Eisenburg!"

Tom Henry 
Tom Henry was inducted into the Hall of Fame in 2018. Tom played at Gettysburg College from 1986-1989 as a flanker and joined Columbia RFC in 1990 as a flanker. Henry continued to play through the merger as a fixture at outside center until retiring in 2007. Tom still plays Old Boy rugby to this day. In addition to his feats on the pitch, Tom has been a major monetary contributor to the club.

Henry was the leading scorer for Gorge for many years being in the right place at the right time and being a good finisher. "My best trait was being able to read the other team in order to break through a hole or pick off a pass," Henry said. "No matter what, I gave 100% all of the time. The fun part of rugby was that we always had 15 guys to hang out with, to play with, and go out afterwards. As I look back, most of my accomplishments are social. I made so many long term friends."

Chuck Moore 
Chuck Moore was inducted into the Hall of Fame in 2018. As an extraordinary player and selfless in his passion for Rocky Gorge, Moore played rugby from 1990-1994 at Frostburg as an eightman. After college, Chuck joined Gorge in January 1995 playing almost every position in the forwards and was captain for four years. While playing, Moore became a Gorge assistant coach under Culpepper and once Culpepper left at the end of the 2005-2006 season, Chuck became head coach for the next season.

Chuck was witness to the maturation of Gorge and was vital to leading to the club's first National Championship taking on many roles in the team leadership. Under his leadership Gorge won the 2012 DII National Championship. Moore said that his biggest accomplishment was "getting Gorge serious and organized. Taking Gorge from a social drinking team to a serious club, but likes to have fun." After the 2012-2013 season, Moore stepped down as head coach, but is still involved in the Gorge 7s program and Capital Select Side.

Greg Florenzo 
Greg Florenzo played in the forwards for Rocky Gorge RFC from 1988 to 2003 and with the GODs from 1999 to 2011. Although he usually played as a loose forward, he filled in at lock and prop when called upon. He was known for his quick wit both on and off the field and the bone-crushing hits upon opponents. He was instrumental in Gorge winning the PRU DII during the 1991 and 1995 seasons, and was named Co-MVP in 1995. Greg continued to grow rugby and expand Rocky Gorge community relations through his coaching with the Howard County Hurricanes. He was always committed to raising funds for Gorge through his tremendous work ethic, extensive networking skills, and his many generous donations. Greg lived his life to the fullest and always played to the final whistle. Unfortunately, Greg passed away in 2017 from cancer.

Vince “Monroe” Michalski 
Vince has been the very fabric of our club for many years. Aside from his career on the pitch, he has been a force away from it as well. He began as a flanker in 1991 and played his final season as a second row in 2011. He was selected to the 1997 PRU Select Side and the MARFU Select Side in 2007. He also played in the Ambassador Shield Matches in 2007-2008. He was a club Secretary from 1992-1994 and Vice President from 2008-2013. He traveled with the Gorge international tours to England in 2003 and Ireland in 2007. He was a friend to all and affectionately nicknamed "Monroe". His most infamous line came during the Ireland Tour in Limerick: "Hey, it's really great to see all you Irish guys in the shower with us." Vince has been and continues to be a bonding ingredient that networks throughout our club and continues to nurture this special fraternity that is Rocky Gorge Rugby.

William “Billy” Weeks 
After playing mostly in New Jersey and Pennsylvania to start his career, Billy began playing for Rocky Gorge in 2000. Over the years, he has played multiple positions from flanker to a strong asset in the backline. Billy seemed to be most comfortable and make the largest impact when slotted at fullback where he used his increbile speed and field awareness. He hung up his boots in 2011 after contributing his talents to the team's first National Playoff appearance. Since his retirement, he has been contributing to the club as Rocky Gorge's official representative within the Referees Society.

Pete “3Pete” Ressler 
What can you say about a little guy that came out to a men's club when he was 17 or 18 and weighed about 135 pounds wearing some stupid no-sleeve Aussie Rules shirt, but with no accent? Normally you would say this guy will be done in a few weeks. Well, you mustn't know Pete. He finished the summer and went to college at St. Mary's. Each year in college he got better and came back each summer to play with Gorge and went back even better. It was a wonderful cycle of improvement driven by heart and skill, but he never seemed to grow. Finally, he came to us full-time and became a large part of Rocky Gorge. Willing to play any position and with the heart of a much larger man, he excelled in the backs. Finally, he starting working out with some of the gym guys and what do you know, he put on like ten pounds! So armed with the new muscles, he became a leader on Gorge in a time when things were not going as planned. He stuck with us and helped us get on a winning track. He was essential in our ascendance as a rugby powerhouse. He became our flyhalf and was as fierce of a competitor as you will find anywhere. Go back and watch some of the highlights in the early 2010s and you will notice it is Pete setting up just about everything. In 2012, he was massive for getting us into and through the playoffs. This little guy played with a torn up knee and totally embarrassed some of the best clubs in the country in 2012. Some guys from Minnesota and from Montauk are still cursing his name. We would not have won those games without some of the plays he made. Unfortunately, his season ended due to that knee. At training right before the Final Four, his knee that must have been held together by lots of athletic tape, several braces, and hope, finally gave way. He still supported the club and became the drunkest man in Denver. Once he healed he came back and led the club to the second National Championship in 2014. Again making some amazing plays and showing that you don't have to be big to be great at rugby. His last game was the 2014 National Championship.

Sean Kelley 
Sean Kelley was a player of exceptional skill and pace. Decent size for a #8, but what set him apart was his long-ranging try-scoring runs that seemed to happen every match. He was a nightmare for defenses as not only could he run around the fastest backs but through the largest of props; that is if one were silly enough to get in his way. He was part of the original Salisbury crew that came out in 2008. He always brought a positive attitude to the team, and of course, was always good for a laugh. He also coined the phrase “Shawk” which would be a flying shark with talons. He was great for the team right from the start and we began winning games we would not have won before when he arrived. He became a leader and a role model for young players. They had to work out harder to try and keep up with him in training. His last start for the Gorge was the 2012 National Championship where he led from the front as always. For the current players, he was the type of player that kept Josh Brown on the bench in 2012. I think Josh will agree that is not a knock on him but a testament to Sean.

Andrew “Air Force” Kendall 
Andrew Kendall played rugby at Salisbury University from 2004 to 2009 amassing several Best Back and MVP Awards through the seasons. Midway through his college tenure, he began playing summer 7s with Rocky Gorge and upon graduation, became a full-time fixture with the club. While he was not the first, nor the last Salisbury alum to join Gorge, his fiery competitiveness raised the level of play among everyone that stepped onto the pitch with him. His ball-handling and kicking prowess from the fullback position helped propel Gorge onto the national stage. He was a key member of the teams that made it to the national playoffs for most of his time with the club. In the run-up to the 2012 National Championship, “Air Force” led the team to more than five, second-half, come-from-behind victories. His on-field play in the 2012 National Championship match was nothing short of miraculous. His well-timed and placed kicks in conjunction with his goal-kicking ability routinely left Wisconsin on the back foot, and ultimately resulted in another comeback win. He was rightfully recognized as the MVP for the 2012 National Championship.

References

External links
Rocky Gorge Rugby Official site
Rocky Gorge Rugby Facebook
Rocky Gorge Rugby Twitter
Capital Rugby Union
Mid-Atlantic Conference
USA Rugby

American rugby union teams